The Roman Catholic Diocese of Latacunga is a diocese located in the city of Latacunga in the Ecclesiastical province of Quito in Ecuador.

Bishops

Ordinaries
Benigno Chiriboga, S.J. (5 Dec 1963 – 3 Dec 1968)
José Mario Ruiz Navas (5 Dec 1968 – 6 Aug 1989), appointed Bishop of Portoviejo (Porto Vecchio)
Raúl Holguer López Mayorga (18 Jun 1990 – 19 Feb 2003)
José Victoriano Naranjo Tovar (19 Feb 2003 – 30 Nov 2016)
Geovanni Mauricio Paz Hurtado (30 Nov 2016–present)

Other priest of this diocese who became bishop
Wilson Abraham Moncayo Jalil, appointed Bishop of Santo Domingo de los Colorados in 2002

Sources
 GCatholic.org
 Catholic Hierarchy

Roman Catholic dioceses in Ecuador
Roman Catholic Ecclesiastical Province of Quito
Christian organizations established in 1963
Roman Catholic dioceses and prelatures established in the 20th century